WOAS is an American educational high school radio station that broadcasts a variety style music format at 88.5 Mhz FM.  The studio and transmitter tower is located at the Ontonagon Area School building. The Ontonagon Area School District holds ownership and U.S. Federal Communications Commission (FCC) licensing for the station.  Operation of the station is conducted by an all volunteer staff that includes students of the Ontonagon Area Schools and local community members.

Hours
The WOAS radio station broadcasts on weekdays from 8 am to 10 pm EST during the school year. The station also does selective broadcasting in August in conjunction with the Porcupine Mountains Music Festival, held at the Porcupine Mountains Wilderness State Park.

Station office hours are on weekdays from 9 am to 3 pm EST during the school year. The station office is located within the Ontonagon Area School building.

Programming
WOAS features on-air student disc jockey programs typically in one-hour blocks from 8 am to 3:30 pm. After 3:30 pm, the station features an assortment of on-air disc jockey programs hosted by local community members and syndicated  shows. Weekly syndicated shows include: "Beale Street Caravan", "Midnight Special", "PorkiesFest Radio", "Dr Duck's Rx for Guitar", "Woodsongs Old Time Radio Hour", "Acooustic Rainbow" and a variety of artists from the "Home Grown Music Network."

The variety format allows students and community staff to program their personal preference of genre during their respective on-air shows as long as it complies with the "terms-of-broadcast" concerning profanity and other points. Some local production of PSAs and promotional materials is also done by the station volunteers.

WOAS features a complete digital media system including three Compact Disc (CD) players, a Computerized Media Processor (CMP) and input jacks for MP3 or headphone based media devices. The only exception to the digital system is a single cassette tape player that is used for select syndicate programs and legacy media.

Live feed
The audio feed has been on and off the internet for the past 10 years due to web platform difficulties and lack of resources.  In early 2014, the WOAS radio station completed implementation of its live internet audio stream. The audio stream broadcasts on the public internet in stereo at 128 KBps. As of March 2016, the main server has been replaced and it is now feeding the weather station on line (also to Weather Underground), video and audio.

History
The first broadcast of the WOAS radio station started at 8:00 AM on Friday, December 15, 1978. The station was managed by the Ontonagon Area High School librarian, Thomas Graham Lee. At the time, the station featured two reel-to-reel players and a vinyl record turntable as well as wiring for remote broadcasting in the cafeteria and gymnasium of the high school building.

Margaret Muskatt succeeded Thomas Lee as manager in 1985 and, in the years that followed, the appeal of the station began to dwindle due to under-funding and aging equipment (which was donated to begin with); this led to a lull in staff morale. In 1987, the Community Schools program took over daily operations under the leadership of Community School Director Mike Bennett. What followed was a decade of growth and operating income for the station and school district as many grants for programs and new equipment were secured.

Through the mid-1990s, the popularity of WOAS again bottomed out as the Community Schools budget took massive hits and their involvement in the radio station eventually folded. The Ontonagon Area School District continued to be the station's owner but operations continued with a skeleton crew of volunteers when the Community Schools program ceased to exist in 1994. In 1995, Bennett became the elementary school principal, which left the station without an acting manager. In 1997, the station hit its lowest point when a license renewal lapse was about to occur and the Ontonagon Area School District directors debated about whether or not to renew the station's FCC license.

Also in 1997, science teachers Ken Raisanen and Chuck Zelinski made a pitch to the school district superintendent John Peterson to take over station operations and save the nearly dead project. They renewed the broadcasting license and began refurbishing the station's infrastructure and equipment. With generous grants from the Ontonagon Area School District (OASD), the Upper Peninsula Power Company (UPPCO), community members and volunteers, the station underwent a major remodeling and equipment replacement.  The station has encountered some difficulty with a stable web platform, but has managed to keep the station's audio stream intact at www.woas-fm.org.  Assistance from REMC 1 has put the WOAS web presence on a stable footing after the initial server was not able to handle the multiple feeds and was replaced by a more capable unit.

Ken Raisanen assumed the Station Manager position in 1997 and he continues as the Station Manager.  Beginning in the 2013–14 school year, students from the Senior Service Project class have developed their own daily program.  The SSP classes developed the first talk format shows and pioneered the'multiple DJ' format. During the 2015–16 school year, 3 of the 7 day shift blocks are being filled by SSP students.  DJs have put together a safe driving campaign with a grant from the Strive for a Safer Drive (S4SD) program jointly sponsored by the State of Michigan and Ford Motor Company.  The local campaign is called 'Don't Be Distracted' or 'DbD' for short.  WOAS marked another milestone in 2015-16 as one of the DJs has featured a live, interactive broadcast with a fellow fan of the band Aviators each Friday via face to face computer networking from Germany.  The station website at www.woas-fm.org hosts the district weather station, audio and video streaming.  The FROM THE VAULTS blog also appears weekly in the local newspaper, The Ontonagon Herald.

References
Michiguide.com - WOAS History
WOAS Station Website
WOAS Documentation & Historical Records

External links

OAS
High school radio stations in the United States
Radio stations established in 1978